Padri Top or Padri Pass is a hill station situated  North of Bhaderwah on [interstate link] Bhaderwah–Chamba National Highway. It is the highest Pass on Bhaderwah-Chamba National Highway located between the borders of Jammu and Kashmir and Himachal Pradesh.

Route
The route starts from provincial headquarter and nearest airport at Jammu.
The road starts from Jammu to Batote (via NH1A), changing route from Batote — Pul Doda (via NH244), turning left near Neeru Bridge towards Doda —Bhaderwah road.

References

Chenab Valley
Doda district